Walter Earl Seibert (December 7, 1910 – May 12, 1990) was a Canadian ice hockey defenceman who played for 15 seasons for the Chicago Black Hawks, New York Rangers and Detroit Red Wings between 1931 and 1946. He was inducted into the Hockey Hall of Fame in 1963.

Playing career
Earl was an important member of the 1933 New York Rangers and 1938 Chicago Black Hawks Stanley Cup victories. Each year from 1935 to 1944, Seibert was selected to the first or second NHL All-Star team (4 times to the first, 6 times to the second). A tenacious defender, Seibert was renowned for rugged physical play, famously being the only player Eddie Shore was unwilling to fight.

An accident during a January 28, 1937 game cast a shadow over Seibert's great career.  Seibert and the legendary Howie Morenz became tangled up behind the Chicago net. Morenz fell awkwardly against the boards and broke his leg in several places. Morenz died in the hospital from complications of the injury several weeks later.

After his NHL retirement, Seibert served as coach of Eddie Shore's Springfield Indians.

He was inducted into the Hockey Hall of Fame in 1963 and joined his father Oliver Seibert as the first father and son combination in the Hall of Fame. In 1998, he was ranked number 72 on [[List of 100 greatest hockey players by The Hockey News|The Hockey News''' list of the 100 Greatest Hockey Players]].

Siebert died following a battle with brain cancer on May 12, 1990.

In the 2009 book 100 Ranger Greats'', the authors ranked Seibert at No. 61 all-time of the 901 New York Rangers who had played during the team's first 82 seasons.

Career statistics

Regular season and playoffs

Coaching statistics

 – midseason replacement

See also
Captain (ice hockey)

References

External links

1910 births
1990 deaths
Canadian expatriate ice hockey players in the United States
Canadian people of German descent
Canadian ice hockey defencemen
Chicago Blackhawks captains
Chicago Blackhawks players
Deaths from brain cancer in the United States
Deaths from cancer in Massachusetts
Detroit Red Wings players
Hockey Hall of Fame inductees
Ice hockey people from Ontario
Indianapolis Capitals players
New York Rangers players
Ontario Hockey Association Senior A League (1890–1979) players
Sportspeople from Kitchener, Ontario
Springfield Indians players
Stanley Cup champions